Bad North is a real-time strategy video game developed by Plausible Concept (a game studio in Malmö, Sweden, founded by Oskar Stålberg and Richard Meredith) and published by Raw Fury. The game was released on August 20, 2018, for the Nintendo Switch, then for PlayStation 4 and Xbox One on August 28. A Microsoft Windows version was released on October 16, 2018. Versions for the mobile platforms Android and iOS followed on October 16, 2019.

Gameplay
Bad North focuses on real-time tactics gameplay. The main goals are to defend the kingdom from the attacking Viking invaders who killed the king and to guide the island's people to evacuate. Islands have different layouts so each poses a different challenge. They are divided into multiple tiles and have houses with Vikings attacking from any corner, so the player's strategy must be well planned to get the opportunity to save the people from the enemy by protecting the houses. The Viking invaders will chuck torches into the houses, and if they burn completely the player will not earn coins for those houses. Gold is needed to get upgrades for units and level up commanders' defenses. The player can also pick up items (represented as question marks in the map) and add new commanders to the Army.

The game offers easy, normal, and hard difficulty options. A "Very Hard" option can be unlocked by completing the game on Hard.

Expansions 
On July 24, 2019, a free expansion for Bad North called "Jotunn Edition" was released.

Reception 
Bad North received "mixed or average reviews" according to Metacritic. The game was nominated for Strategy/Simulation Game of the Year at the D.I.C.E. Awards.

References

Further reading

External links 

 

2018 video games
Nintendo Switch games
PlayStation 4 games
PlayStation 4 Pro enhanced games
Xbox One games
Indie video games
IOS games
Android (operating system) games
Real-time strategy video games
Single-player video games
Video games developed in Sweden
Windows games
Video games set in the Viking Age
Raw Fury games